Jijo Joseph Tutu (born 10 April 1992) is an Indian professional footballer who plays as a midfielder for I-League club Gokulam Kerala.

Who captained the Kerala state football team for the Santosh Trophy in 2021–22, and won the player of the tournament award for his performance.

He worked as a clerk for the State Bank of India and earlier played for their departmental team. He was candidate to sign for East Bengal Club, after securing a release from his department.

Career

Gokulam Kerala 
Gokulam Kerala announced his signing on 30 January 2023.

Career statistics

Club

Honours
Santosh Trophy:- 2021-22

References 

Living people
Year of birth missing (living people)
Indian footballers